The Thailand men's national 3x3 team is the 3x3 basketball team representing Thailand in international men's competitions.

The team lost their bronze medal match in the men's tournament at the 2018 Asian Games held in Jakarta, Indonesia.

The team also lost their bronze medal match in the men's 3x3 tournament at the 2019 Southeast Asian Games held in the Philippines.

References

 
Basketball
Men's national 3x3 basketball teams